Pseudorchestes is a genus of beetles belonging to the family Curculionidae.

The species of this genus are found in Southern Europe.

Species:
 Pseudorchestes abdurakhmanovi Korotyaev, 1991
 Pseudorchestes amplithorax E.Reitter, 1911

References

Curculionidae
Curculionidae genera